Berainak or Badnak is a village in the Nicobar district of Andaman and Nicobar Islands, India. It is located in the Nancowry tehsil. The name is also spelt as "Bada Inak" ("Greater Inak"; contrasted with Chota Inak or "Little Inak").

Demographics 

According to the 2011 census of India, Berainak/Badnak has 38 households. The effective literacy rate (i.e. the literacy rate of population excluding children aged 6 and below) is 64.38%.

References 

Villages in Nancowry tehsil